BMO Tower, also known as BMO Harris Financial Center at Market Square, is a 25-story, 328-foot tower in Milwaukee, Wisconsin. The building was scheduled to be completed in December 2019, but construction delays postponed the opening until April 2020. The building is 281,000 square feet and 328 feet tall.

History

The developer, Irgens Development Partners, purchased a 20-story building and a parking lot as the site for this high rise. On November 17, 2017 demolition of the existing structures began. Construction began in December 2017. The total cost of the BMO project was $175 million. It is one of the tallest office towers in Milwaukee.

The construction encountered delays such as a water lateral break which flooded the lower floors of the building. In January 2020 The buildings developer Irgens fired the general contractor J.H. Findorff & Son and hired another builder, Pepper Construction, to finish the building.

The BMO Financial Center was designed by Kahler Slater. It is a glass tower.

Tenants
BMO Harris Bank
Law firm Michael Best & Friedrich LLP - top three floors
Heartland Advisors, Inc.
Andrus Intellectual Property Law LLP
Kahler Slater - 17th floor

See also
List of tallest buildings in Milwaukee

References

External links

Kahler Slater BMO Project
Irgens Development Partners

Skyscraper office buildings in Milwaukee
Office buildings completed in 2020
Bank of Montreal